is a former municipality in the old Sør-Trøndelag county, Norway. The  municipality existed from 1838 until its dissolution in 1964. The municipality was located in the north-central part of what is now the municipality of Midtre Gauldal in Trøndelag county. The administrative center was the village of Støren where Støren Church is located.

History
The prestegjeld of Støren was established as a civil municipality on 1 January 1838 (see formannskapsdistrikt). In 1841, the large municipality of Støren was divided into three municipalities: Horg in the north (population: 2,374), Støren in the east (population: 2,312), and Soknedal in the west (population: 1,966). In 1879, the southern part of Støren (population: 585) was separated to form the new municipality of Budal. This left Støren with 1,840 residents. During the 1960s, there were many municipal mergers across Norway due to the work of the Schei Committee. On 1 January 1964, the municipalities of Budal (population: 529), Singsås (population: 1,554), Soknedal (population: 1,916), and Støren (population: 2,296) were all merged to form the new municipality of Midtre Gauldal.

Name
The municipality was named after the old Støren farm, since the first Støren Church was built there. The first element is staurr''' which means "pointed pole" and the last element is vin which means "meadow" or "pasture". The word staurr is probably referring to the pointed headland on which the church is located. The two rivers that form this headland are the Gaula and Sokna''.

Government
All municipalities in Norway, including Støren, are responsible for primary education (through 10th grade), outpatient health services, senior citizen services, unemployment and other social services, zoning, economic development, and municipal roads. The municipality is governed by a municipal council of elected representatives, which in turn elects a mayor.

Municipal council
The municipal council  of Støren was made up of 17 representatives that were elected to four year terms. The party breakdown of the final municipal council was as follows:

Media gallery

See also
List of former municipalities of Norway

References

Midtre Gauldal
Former municipalities of Norway
1838 establishments in Norway
1964 disestablishments in Norway